Tajrud (also Romanized as Tajrūd) is a village in Barrud Rural District, Kuhsorkh County, Razavi Khorasan Province, Iran. At the 2006 census, its population was 216, in 62 families.

References 

Populated places in Kuhsorkh County